The Geelong Football Club has participated in the Australian Football League (AFL) Draft since it was first established in 1986, when it was known as the Victorian Football League (VFL).

VFL/AFL

Draft selections 
A mid-season draft was held each year from 1990 to 1993, allowing clubs to add players during the season. Since 2016, clubs have had the option of nominating category B rookies to directly join their club's rookie list, rather than via the Rookie Draft as previously required.

Trades

Free agency 
Since free agency was introduced at the conclusion of the 2012 season, Geelong has seen players both arrive and depart the club via free agency.

 Tyson Stengle was delisted by  during the 2021 pre-season

AFL Women's

Draft selections

Trades

Free agency and expansion signings

See also 
 List of Geelong Football Club players

Notes

References 

Draft and trade History
Australian Football League draft